William Stanback (born July 6, 1994) is a gridiron football running back for the Montreal Alouettes of the Canadian Football League (CFL). He played college football at Virginia Union and UCF. He has also been a member of the Green Bay Packers and Las Vegas Raiders of the National Football League (NFL).

College career
Stanback began his college football career at UCF. In 2013, during a game against Rutgers, Stanback delivered a hit to Rutgers defensive back Anthony Cioffi that went viral and made that night's SportsCenter Top 10 plays. In 2014, Stanback was named to the All-American Athletic Conference First-team. On September 22, 2015, Stanback was dismissed from UCF after reportedly failing multiple marijuana tests. Stanback then played for Virginia Union. In 2016, he rushed for 1,299 yards and was named to the All-CIAA First Team.

Professional career

Green Bay Packers 
Stanback signed with the Green Bay Packers in May 2017. He was released by the Packers on August 28, 2017.

Montreal Alouettes 
Stanback signed with the Montreal Alouettes of the Canadian Football League (CFL) in May 2018. He started receiving significant playing time in August 2018, and a month later the Alouettes traded Tyrell Sutton to the BC Lions; moving Stanback into the starting running back role. Stanback finished his rookie season having played in 16 games, carrying the ball 81 times for 539 yards – he also caught 25 passes for 313 yards with two touchdowns. Stanback had a breakout game in Week 4 of the 2019 season, rushing for 203 yards and three touchdowns. He was named one of three players of the month for the month of July. He played in 14 regular season games for the Alouettes in 2019, recording 170 carries for 1048 rushing yards and five touchdowns and 33 receptions for 329 receiving yards. At season's end he was named a CFL All-Star.

Las Vegas Raiders
On January 3, 2020, the Las Vegas Raiders signed Stanback to a reserve/futures contract. He was waived on August 23, 2020.

Montreal Alouettes (II) 
On December 14, 2020, it was announced that Stanback had re-signed with the Alouettes to a two-year contract. In 2021, he played in 12 regular season games in a shortened season, but still recorded a 1000-yard season after recording 193 carries for 1,176 yards and three touchdowns. He also tied a single-game career-high total for rushing yards after rushing 24 times for 203 yards and a touchdown against the Toronto Argonauts on October 22, 2021. At the end of the season, he was named the East Division's Most Outstanding Player. The following season Stanback suffered a broken ankle in the first game of the season and was placed on the six-game injured reserve list. He returned to practice on September 27, 2022 with five games remaining in the regular season.

References

External links
 Montreal Alouettes bio

1994 births
Living people
American players of Canadian football
American football running backs
Canadian football running backs
Montreal Alouettes players
Las Vegas Raiders players
Players of American football from New York (state)
People from Hempstead (town), New York
Sportspeople from Nassau County, New York
UCF Knights football players
Virginia Union Panthers football players